The 2011 FIM Nice Croatian Speedway World Championship Grand Prix was the tenth race of the 2011 Speedway Grand Prix season. It took place on September 24 at the Stadium Milenium in Donji Kraljevec, Croatia.

Riders 
The Speedway Grand Prix Commission nominated Matej Žagar as Wild Card, and Dino Kovačić and Matija Duh both as Track Reserves. The Draw was made on September 23.

Results 
Grand Prix was won by Andreas Jonsson who beat Chris Harris, Fredrik Lindgren and Greg Hancock in the final.

After the event, championship leader Greg Hancock has more than 24 points over second Andreas Jonsson and becoming 2011 World Champion. Hancock is the oldest World Champion in history, beating Ivan Mauger. Between first and last champion title was 14 years; former the longest period was 11 years (Mauger 1968-1979).

Heat details

Heat after heat 
 (60,92) Jonsson, Pedersen, Lindbäck, Holta 
 (60,17) Sayfutdinov, Bjerre, Hampel, Žagar
 (60,39) Hancock, Laguta, Holder, Kołodziej 
 (60,32) Harris, Lindgren, Crump, Gollob 
 (60,98) Harris, Holder, Jonsson, Hampel
 (60,84) Sayfutdinov, Laguta, Lindgren, Pedersen (Fx)
 (60,81) Gollob, Hancock, Žagar, Lindbäck
 (59,84) Bjerre, Holta, Kołodziej, Crump
 (60,65) Hancock, Crump, Sayfutdinov, Jonsson (F)
 (60,03) Hampel, Pedersen, Gollob, Kołodzej
 (60,34) Lindgren, Bjerre, Holder, Lindbäck
 (60,98) Harris, Žagar, Holta, Laguta
 (61,26) Jonsson, Lindgren, Žagar, Kołodziej
 (61,15) Hancock, Harris, Bjerre, Pedersen
 (60,25) Hampel, Crump, Lindbäck, Laguta
 (60,98) Sayfutdinov, Holta, Holder, Gollob 
 (61,78) Bjerre, Jonsson, Gollob, Laguta
 (61,81) Crump, Holder, Žagar, Pedersen
 (62,02) Kołodziej, Harris, Lindbäck, Sayfutdinov
 (61,42) Holta, Hampel, Hancock, Lindgren 
 Semi-finals:
 (61,09) Jonsson, Harris, Holta, Sayfutdinov
 (61,68) Hancock, Lindgren, Bjerre, Hampel 
 the Final:
 (61,65) Jonsson (6 points), Harris (4), Lindgren (2), Hancock (0)

The intermediate classification

See also 
 motorcycle speedway

References 

Croatia
Speedway Grand Prix
2011